Homeobox protein DLX-6 is a protein that in humans is encoded by the DLX6 gene.

This gene encodes a member of a homeobox transcription factor gene family similar to the Drosophila distal-less gene. This family has at least six members that encode proteins with roles in forebrain and craniofacial development. This gene is in a tail-to-tail configuration with another member of the family on the long arm of chromosome 7.

References

Further reading